West Malling railway station (sometimes shown as West Malling for Kings Hill) lies to the east of West Malling, Kent, England, and is close to Kings Hill, Larkfield and Leybourne.

The station, and all trains serving it, is operated by Southeastern.

History
It was renamed West Malling on 23 May 1949. The goods yard had four sidings, one of which served a goods shed. Freight facilities were withdrawn on 19 May 1964. The signal box closed on 9 December 1983.

The ticket office at the station is staffed for most of the day. There are self-service Scheidt and Bachmann ticket machines on both platforms. A PERTIS passenger-operated ticket machine was once located on Platform 1 for the issue of 'Permit to Travel' tickets (which are exchanged on-train or at staffed stations for travel tickets) but this was withdrawn some years ago.

Nu-Venture bus 123 provides a regular link to/from Kings Hill (some journeys via West Malling) on Mondays to Fridays (not late evening). Through road-rail ticketing using Bus 123 is available to 'KINGS HILL BUS' from rail stations in SE England.

Services
All services at West Malling are operated by Southeastern using  and  EMUs.

The typical off-peak service in trains per hour is:
 1 tph to 
 1 tph to London Charing Cross

During the peak hours, the station is served by an additional hourly service between London Victoria and Ashford International.

On Sundays, the services between London Charing Cross and Maidstone East do not run.

References
References

Sources

External links

Railway stations in Kent
DfT Category D stations
Former London, Chatham and Dover Railway stations
Railway stations in Great Britain opened in 1874
Railway stations served by Southeastern
1874 establishments in England
West Malling